Věcov is a municipality and village in Žďár nad Sázavou District in the Vysočina Region of the Czech Republic. It has about 700 inhabitants.

Administrative parts
Villages of Jimramovské Pavlovice, Koníkov, Míchov, Odranec and Roženecké Paseky are administrative parts of Věcov.

References

Villages in Žďár nad Sázavou District